Danny McIntosh (born 1 March 1980) is a British former professional boxer who competed from 2005 to 2014. He held the European light-heavyweight title in 2011 and competed in the 30th Prizefighter series.

Professional career
McIntosh's first professional fight took place in April 2005 at the Sports Village in Norwich and resulted in a six-round points victory over Omid Bourzo.  He fought twice more in 2005 winning on both occasions leaving him with a record of 3-0 at the end of his first year.  McIntosh then had a full year away from the ring before returning in October 2006 with a win over the then unbeaten Matty Hough (5-0) in Walsall.  Only two fights followed in 2007 with victories over experienced journeyman Rob Burton and a career best performance ending the unbeaten record of Joey Vegas (then 10-0).  One more victory in February 2008 enhanced his record to 7-0 and set him up for a shot at the English light heavyweight title.

English Champion
Danny's first professional title win came on the undercard of Jonathon Thaxton's European title victory over Juan Diaz Melero at the Norwich Showground on 4 October 2008.  The experienced Steve Spartacus represented a step up for McIntosh but he won in the 7th round to claim the title.  McIntosh has since made two defences of the belt beating Nottingham's Rod Anderton on 6 December 2008 and Southampton's Matthew Barney on 28 March 2009.

On 18 July 2009 McIntosh challenged Commonwealth champion Nathan Cleverly for the vacant British title in what was only his 11th fight as a professional.  He was defeated for the first time when, having been knocked down on four occasions, the fight was stopped in the 7th round.  Following the fight McIntosh said he would learn from the "nightmare", saying that Cleverly had taught him a boxing lesson.  His next fight on 19 February 2010 saw him put that night behind him with a third successful defence of his English title.  The fight, on the undercard of a Ricky Hatton promoted bill, saw him retain the title with a 2nd round stoppage over former British champion Tony Oakey.  McIntosh stepped up to cruiserweight in his next fight at the Castle Leisure Center in Bury on 6 November 2010 beating journeyman Hastings Rasani in the 3rd round of what was a non-title contest.

European Title challenge
On 22 January 2011 McIntosh traveled to France to challenge Thierry Karl for the vacant European title.  Despite being behind on points, McIntosh was able to take control of the fight in the 11th round prompting the referee to stop the fight and hand the title to McIntosh.  The first defence of the title was, however, to end in defeat when on 7 May 2011 McIntosh traveling to Germany to defend against local boxer Eduard Gutknecht, losing in the 8th round.

Professional boxing record

References

External links

1980 births
Living people
English male boxers
Light-heavyweight boxers
Sportspeople from Norwich